The 1943 USC Trojans football team represented the University of Southern California (USC) in the 1943 college football season. In their second year under head coach Jeff Cravath, the Trojans compiled an 8–2 record (5–0 against conference opponents), won the Pacific Coast Conference championship, defeated Washington in the 1944 Rose Bowl, and outscored their opponents by a combined total of 155 to 58.

Schedule

References

USC
USC Trojans football seasons
Pac-12 Conference football champion seasons
Rose Bowl champion seasons
USC Trojans football